The following Lists of films based on location are classified by the geographic area in which the films were set or shot:

Africa
 Africa
 Egypt
 Morocco
 Nigeria
 Abuja
 Lagos

Asia
 Burma
 China
 Hong Kong
 Macau
 Shanghai
 India
 Rajasthan
 Japan
 Malaysia
 Pakistan
 The Philippines
 Singapore
 Thailand

Europe
 Austria
 France
 Marseille
 Paris
 Germany
 Berlin
 Hungary
Budapest
 Ireland
Italy
 Sicily
 Malta
 Poland
 Portugal
Spain
Madrid
 Turkey
 Istanbul
 United Kingdom
 Brighton
 Glasgow
 Liverpool
 London
 Wales

Latin America
 Argentina
 Brazil
 Colombia
 El Salvador
 Guatemala
 Mexico
 Peru

Middle East
 Iran
 Iraq
 Israel
 Kuwait

North America

Canada
 Quebec
 Toronto
 Vancouver
 Winnipeg (includes TV shows)

United States
U.S. states/regions
Arizona
Hawaii
Kansas
Minnesota
New England
New Jersey
Oregon
Pennsylvania
Puerto Rico
Southern United States

U.S. cities
 Baltimore
 Boston
 Charleston
 Chicago
 Dallas
 Harrisburg
 Houston
 Las Vegas
 Los Angeles
 Miami
 New Orleans
 New York City
 Statue of Liberty
 Palm Springs, California
 Set in Palm Springs
 Shot in Palm Springs
 Pittsburgh
 Portland
 San Diego
 San Francisco
 Tampa

Oceania
 Australia
 List of films set in Sydney
 New Zealand

References